The Jenny McCarthy Show  was an American television variety show and sketch comedy series starring Jenny McCarthy that aired on MTV in 1997.

Reception

The show was critically panned.

References

External links
 

1997 American television series debuts
1997 American television series endings
1990s American sketch comedy television series
English-language television shows
MTV original programming
1990s American variety television series
McCarthy family